"It Can Only Get Better" is an English language song by Swedish singer Amy Diamond. It was written by Gustav Jonsson, Tommy Tysper and Marcus Sepehrmanesh and appears in Amy Diamond's second album Still Me Still Now. The song was released by Amy Diamond as a single reaching #19 in Sverigetopplistan, the Swedish Singles Chart at end of 2006 (week 50 chart).

Charts

Charice version

The song was covered by Filipino singer Charice, now known as Jake Zyrus, for his self-titled extended play. It was then released as his first commercial single.

See also
"Era stupendo"

References

2006 singles
2006 songs
2009 debut singles
Amy Deasismont songs
Jake Zyrus songs
Songs written by Tommy Tysper
Songs written by Marcus Sepehrmanesh